Ryan Wagner (born April 15, 1996) is an American professional ice hockey forward currently playing for the Colorado Eagles in the American Hockey League (AHL).

Playing career

Amateur
Wagner played as a youth within his homestate, Illinois, with the Chicago Mission of the HPHL through to the under-16 level before joining the U.S. National Team Development program to play the 2013–14 season with the under-17 and under-18 teams. While attending Ann Arbor Pioneer High School, he registered 9 points through 28 games within the United States Hockey League (USHL) before committing to a collegiate career with the University of Wisconsin of the Big Ten Conference (B1G).

After completing his freshman season with the Badgers in the 2014–15 season, contributing with a modest 2 goals and 5 points through 35 games, Wagner increased his presence through his sophomore season surpassing his entire freshman points totals through the first 9 games and finishing the 2015–16 season with 10 goals and 22 points in 35 games.

Appearing in every game with the Wisconsin Badgers as a junior in the 2016–17 season, Wagner established his identity as a high compete checking-line role player, in posting 9 goals and 28 points through 36 contests. 

Returning for his senior season with the Badgers, Wagner was selected as an alternate captain for the 2017–18 season. Establishing a new career best with 15 goals and 33 points, Wagner appeared in all 37 games with Wisconsin and drew his collegiate career to a close in receiving the teams' Spike Carlson/Chris Chelios Most Valuable Player award.

Professional
Having concluded his four-year college hockey tenure, Wagner embarked on his professional career in initially signing a professional tryout contract with hometown team the Chicago Wolves of the American Hockey League on March 8, 2018. He made his professional debut against the Milwaukee Admirals and registered an assist, on March 9, 2018, and appeared in 7 games with the Wolves to complete the 2017–18 regular season. 

Impressing the Wolves NHL affiliate, the Vegas Golden Knights, Wagner was re-signed by Chicago to a one-year AHL contract on May 10, 2018. In the 2018–19 season, Wagner registered his first professional goal, in a 4-2 victory over the Manitoba Moose on November 18, 2018. As a depth forward for the Wolves, Wagner finished the regular season with 4 goals and 7 points through 49 regular season games. He appeared in 14 playoff games with the Wolves helping the team reach the Calder Cup finals in a defeat to the Charlotte Checkers.

As a free agent, Wagner left the Wolves organization in the off-season and was signed to a one-year, two-way AHL contract with the Colorado Eagles, affiliate to the Colorado Avalanche, on July 31, 2019. Splitting the 2019–20 season between the Eagles and ECHL affiliate, the Utah Grizzlies, Wagner registered 20 points through 23 games for the Grizzlies before contributing and eclipsing his previous season AHL totals with 6 goals and 10 points in just 24 games before the remainder of the season was cancelled due to the COVID-19 pandemic.  

On April 8, 2020, the Eagles opted to re-sign Wagner to a one-year AHL contract extension for the 2020–21 season. In showing development and growth within the Eagles in a checking-line role, Wagner was elevated as an alternate captain during the campaign and contributed with 5 goals and 13 points through 34 regular season games of the pandemic shortened season. 

On June 24, 2021, Wagner continued his tenure with the Eagle by agreeing to a two-year contract extension. Adding an energetic presence to the Eagles, Wagner notched career high marks in the 2021–22 season, in registering 10 goals and 14 assists for 24 points through 50 regular season games. He helped the Eagles advance to the Divisional Finals against the Stockton Heat, finishing with 4 goals in 9 games.

Entering his third year as an alternate captain with the Eagles in the 2022–23 season, Wagner made his 200th AHL appearance in a 5-2 victory over the Ontario Reign on January 18, 2023.

Personal
Born to Dan and Pattie Wagner, he attended Maine South High School in Park Ridge, Illinois, and Ann Arbor Pioneer High School. As part of a sporting family, his father played collegiate baseball at Northwestern and his three younger siblings, Bridget, Megan and Sean all played collegiate hockey.

Career statistics

Regular season and playoffs

International

References

External links
 

1996 births
Living people
Chicago Wolves players
Colorado Eagles players
USA Hockey National Team Development Program players
Utah Grizzlies (ECHL) players
Wisconsin Badgers men's ice hockey players